Alexandru Paul Curtean (born 27 March 1987 in Sibiu) is a Romanian footballer who plays as a midfielder for Corvinul Hunedoara.

Personal life 
Born in Sibiu, Curtean was born into a sporting family. His father, Dan Curtean, was also a football player in the early 1980s and played for Șoimii Sibiu, Steaua București, Olt Scornicești and Luceafărul București. His mother, Carmen, was a professional handball player, and his sister, Daciana, is also an active handball player.

Club career

Early career 
He started his career at FC Sibiu, but he transferred to Gaz Metan when was still young being recruited by coach Ioan Ovidiu Sabău.

Gaz Metan Mediaș 
The younger player was imposed and became important piece in first eleven, helping his team advance in Liga 1. In first season in Liga 1, he made a fantastic matches, scores 7 goals in 14 appearances and major league teams putting an eye on him.

Politehnica Timișoara 
Politehnica Timișoara paid for him €1,300,000 to CS Gaz Metan Mediaș. He signed with FC Politehnica Timișoara on 27 January 2009 for 5 years. In first year has not been settled and fans criticized him for being too careless. But at started the 2010–2011 season, was appointed Vladimir Petrović as the new coach who reinvented him and scores two goals against league champions CFR Cluj.

Dinamo București 
In January 2012, Curtean was transferred to Dinamo București. He signed a contract for four and a half years, until June 2016. He scored his first goal for Dinamo in a game against U Cluj, on 2 May 2012. 15 days later, on 17 May 2012, Curtean scored a goal in the eternal derby against Steaua, at his first appearance in this derby.

Botev Plovdiv 
Curtean arrived in Botev Plovdiv on 11 January 2014, signing a contract for 2 and a half years with the club. But the contract was terminated after only six months due to the financial problems plaguing the club.

Gaz Metan Mediaș 
In September 2014, Curtean reached an agreement with his former club Gaz Metan Mediaș.

Poli Timișoara 
After Gaz Metan's relegation, in 2015, Curtean became a free agent and signed a contract with Poli Timișoara.

Honours

Club
Dinamo București:
Romanian Cup: 2011–12
Romanian Supercup: 2012

Hermannstadt
Cupa României: Runner-up 2017–18

Viitorul Șelimbăr
Liga III: 2020–21

References

External links
 
 

1987 births
Living people
Sportspeople from Sibiu
Romanian footballers
Association football midfielders
Romania under-21 international footballers
Liga I players
Liga II players
Liga III players
First Professional Football League (Bulgaria) players
Kazakhstan Premier League players
CS Gaz Metan Mediaș players
FC Politehnica Timișoara players
FC Dinamo București players
Botev Plovdiv players
ACS Poli Timișoara players
FC Atyrau players
FC Hermannstadt players
CSC 1599 Șelimbăr players
CS Corvinul Hunedoara players
Romanian expatriate footballers
Romanian expatriate sportspeople in Bulgaria
Expatriate footballers in Bulgaria
Romanian expatriate sportspeople in Kazakhstan
Expatriate footballers in Kazakhstan